Vision City may refer to:

 Vision City (Hong Kong), a high-rise development in the Tsuen Wan district of the Hong Kong's New Territories
 Vision City (Rwanda), a housing development in the Rwandan capital, Kigali
 Quill City, formerly Vision City, a partially completed integrated development project in Kuala Lumpur, Malaysia.